Udea vacunalis is a moth in the family Crambidae. It was described by Augustus Radcliffe Grote in 1881. It is found in North America, where it has been recorded from California.

The wingspan is about 24 mm. The forewings are pale yellowish white without markings. The hindwings are pure white, immaculate, with a dotted exterior black line, only partially continued. There is a terminal row of dots at the base of the white fringes. Adults are on wing from July to August.

References

vacunalis
Moths of North America
Fauna of California
Moths described in 1881
Taxa named by Augustus Radcliffe Grote